Ellis Island is part of the Great Barrier Reef Marine Park West of Cape Melville, Queensland and East of Coen in the Claremont Isles between the first  and the second three-mile opening of the Barrier Reef.

The elevation of the terrain is 1.57 meters.

References

Islands on the Great Barrier Reef